Uyttersprot is a Dutch surname. Notable people with the surname include:

 Karel Uyttersprot (born 1949), Belgian politician
 Ilse Uyttersprot  (1967–2020), Belgian politician

Dutch-language surnames